Kshetra Pratap Adhikary (1943 (March/April) – 14 April 2014) was a Nepali poet, writer and lyricist. Adhikari is best known as the lyricist of the song Ma Ta Laligurans Bhayechu by Narayan Gopal. Renowned singers of both the past and present generations, including Narayan Gopal, Bacchu Kailash, Ram Krishna Dhakal, Yogeshwar Amatya, Satya Raj Acharya, Kunti Moktan and Swaroop Raj Acharya have lent their voices to Adhikari's songs. Some of his popular publications are Rahar Lagera, Pahad Dekhi Pahad Samma, Feri Euta Pariwartan, Tara Desh Rahirahecha etc.

See also
List of Nepalese poets

References 

Nepalese male poets
20th-century Nepalese poets
Nepali-language writers
1943 births
2014 deaths
20th-century male writers
Nepali-language poets
People from Tanahun District
20th-century Nepalese male writers
Sajha Puraskar winners